Fullerton is a town in Dickey County, North Dakota, United States. The population was 62 at the 2020 census.

History
The city was named after Grand Rapids, Michigan lawyer Edward Philo Fuller (1820–1866). In the 1880s, Edward Fuller was a major investor in the Dickey County land acquisitions with his daughter and son-in-law, Sofia (Fuller) Sweet (1854–1923) and her husband, Grand Rapids mayor Edwin Forrest Sweet (1847–1935). Sweet Ranch was located just to the southwest of what would later become the town of Fullerton.

In 1887, Fullerton's original town plots were surveyed and the Soo Line Railroad through the town site was completed in September 1887.
A post office was established at Fullerton in 1888, and remained in operation until 1989.

Geography
Fullerton is located at  (46.162648, -98.427734).

Climate

Demographics

2010 census
As of the census of 2010, there were 54 people in 31 households, including 14 families, in the city. The racial makup of the city was 98.1% White and 1.9% from other races. Hispanic or Latino of any race were 1.9%.

Of the 31 households 9.7% had children under the age of 18 living with them, 32.3% were married couples living together, 3.2% had a female householder with no husband present, 9.7% had a male householder with no wife present, and 54.8% were non-families. 51.6% of households were one person and 16.2% were one person aged 65 or older. The average household size was 1.74 and the average family size was 2.50.

The median age was 49 years. 14.8% of residents were under the age of 18; 7.5% were between the ages of 18 and 24; 22.2% were from 25 to 44; 29.7% were from 45 to 64; and 25.9% were 65 or older. The gender makeup of the city was 57.4% male and 42.6% female.

2000 census
As of the census of 2000, there were 85 people in 36 households, including 20 families, in the city. The population density was 238.1 people per square mile (91.2/km). There were 39 housing units at an average density of 109.2 per square mile (41.8/km). The racial makup of the city was 95.29% White, and 4.71% from two or more races. Hispanic or Latino of any race were 2.35% of the population. 35.4% were of Czech, 27.7% Irish, 16.9% German and 7.7% Polish ancestry.

Of the 36 households 33.3% had children under the age of 18 living with them, 44.4% were married couples living together, 5.6% had a female householder with no husband present, and 44.4% were non-families. 41.7% of households were one person and 27.8% were one person aged 65 or older. The average household size was 2.36 and the average family size was 3.40.

The age distribution was 35.3% under the age of 18, 7.1% from 18 to 24, 23.5% from 25 to 44, 17.6% from 45 to 64, and 16.5% 65 or older. The median age was 31 years. For every 100 females, there were 97.7 males. For every 100 females age 18 and over, there were 103.7 males.

The median household income was $33,958 and the median family income was $34,583. Males had a median income of $26,250 versus $15,000 for females. The per capita income for the city was $13,222. There were 5.0% of families and 22.4% of the population living below the poverty line, including 30.0% of under eighteens and 25.0% of those over 64.

Education
Ellendale School District is the local school district.

References

Cities in North Dakota
Cities in Dickey County, North Dakota
Populated places established in 1888
1888 establishments in Dakota Territory